Peter Charles Newman  (born May 10, 1929) is a Canadian journalist and writer.

Life and career
Born in Vienna, Austria, Newman emigrated from Nazi-occupied Czechoslovakia to Canada in 1940 as a Jewish refugee.  His parents were Wanda Maria and Oscar Karel Neumann, a self-made wealthy factory owner. Newman was educated at Upper Canada College, where he was a member of Seaton's House, and the University of Toronto. He has been a reporter for the Financial Post, served as editor of the Toronto Star, and was the long-time editor of  Maclean's, stewarding its transformation from a general interest magazine to a weekly news magazine. He continues to write a column for the periodical. In 1978 he was made an Officer of the Order of Canada and was promoted to the rank of Companion in 1990.

Newman is widely respected for his intimate knowledge and understanding of Canadian business leaders. His 1975 book, The Canadian Establishment, was widely acclaimed. Newman made his name as an author in the 1960s with the publication of two books: Renegade in Power: The Diefenbaker Years (1963), a study of the government of John Diefenbaker that some say helped destroy the Tory leader's career, and The Distemper of Our Times (1968), an examination of Canadian politics during the era of Lester Pearson.

On September 12, 2005, Newman announced the publication of The Secret Mulroney Tapes: Unguarded Confessions of a Prime Minister, a biography of former Canadian prime minister Brian Mulroney, whom he considers a friend. The information released to the press contained several surprising revelations, including an allegation by Mulroney that Pierre Trudeau's contribution "was not to build Canada but to destroy it."  Later the same day, Mulroney issued a press release stating he felt "devastated" and "betrayed" by the publication of information he had understood to be confidential. Shortly after the publication of The Secret Mulroney Tapes, both Mulroney and Conrad Black filed suit against Newman.

Newman has been married four times, once to writer Christina McCall. He lives with his fourth wife, Alvy (Bjorklund) Newman, in Belleville, Ontario.

He joined the Royal Canadian Navy reserve in 1947 as an Ordinary Seaman and later reached the rank of Captain, having served in the naval reserve for 50 years.  He was appointed Visiting Professor of Distinction at Ryerson University in Toronto in December 2009.  In October 2012 he joined the faculty of the Royal Military College of Canada as its first journalist-in-residence.  In this role he is involved with RMC's graduate and undergraduate programs and gives lectures on topics relating to business, politics and history.

In 1973 Newman described his "ideological swing… away from a blind acceptance of the 'small-l' liberalism of the Fifties to a strongly-felt nationalism."

Bibliography
 1959 Flame of Power: Intimate Profiles of Canada's Greatest Businessmen
 1963 Renegade in Power: The Diefenbaker Years
 1968 The Distemper of Our Times: Canadian Politics in Transition
 1969 A Nation Divided: Canada and the Coming of Pierre Trudeau
 1972 Their Turn to Curtsy: Your Turn to Bow
 1973 Home Country: People, Places, and Power Politics
 1975 The Canadian Establishment: Volume One: The Old Order
 1978 Bronfman Dynasty: The Rothschilds of the New World (published in America in 1979 under the different title, King of the Castle: The Making of a Dynasty)
 1981 The Canadian Establishment: Volume Two: The Acquisitors
 1982 The Establishment Man: Conrad Black, A Portrait of Power
 1983 True North, Not Strong and Free: Defending the Peaceable Kingdom in the Nuclear Age
 1983 Debrett's Illustrated Guide to the Canadian Establishment (editor)
 1984 Drawn and Quartered: The Trudeau Years
 1985 A History of the Hudson's Bay Company: Volume One: Company of Adventurers
 1987 A History of the Hudson's Bay Company: Volume Two: Caesars of the Wilderness
 1989 Empire of the Bay: An Illustrated History of the Hudson Bay Company
 1991 A History of the Hudson's Bay Company: Volume Three: Merchant Princes
 1989 Canada: The Great Lone Land
 1991 Canada 1892: Portrait of a Promised Land
 1993 Promise of the Pipeline
 1995 Nortel, Northern Telecom: Past, Present, Future
 1995 The Canadian Revolution: From Deference to Defiance
 1996 Defining Moments: Dispatches from an Unfinished Revolution
 1996 Vancouver: The Art of Living Well
 1998 The Canadian Establishment: Volume Three: The Titans
 1998 Sometimes a Great Nation: Will Canada Belong to the 21st Century?
 1998 Canada: The Land that Shapes Us
 2002 Continental Reach
 2004 Here Be Dragons: Telling Tales of People, Passion and Power (Autobiography)
 2005 The Secret Mulroney Tapes: Unguarded Confessions of a Prime Minister
 2008 Izzy: The Passionate Life and Turbulent Times of Izzy Asper, Canada's Media Mogul
 2010 Heroes: Canadian Champions, Dark Horses, and Icons
 2010 Mavericks: Canadian Rebels, Renegades, and Anti-Heroes
 2011 When the Gods Changed: The Death of Liberal Canada (originally titled: Michael Ignatieff: The Man In Full)
 2016 "Hostages to Fortune: The United Empire Loyalists and The Making of Canada"

References

External links
 
 Peter C. Newman Archive at McMaster University
 Peter C. Newman CBC Life and Times profile.
 Peter C. Newman at The Canadian Encyclopedia
 
 Peter C. Newman at Western Libraries

1929 births
Canadian biographers
Male biographers
Canadian columnists
20th-century Canadian historians
Canadian business and financial journalists
Canadian male non-fiction writers
Canadian magazine editors
Canadian memoirists
Canadian social commentators
Canadian nationalists
Companions of the Order of Canada
Czech Jews
Toronto Star people
University of Toronto alumni
Upper Canada College alumni
Living people
Jewish emigrants from Nazi Germany to Canada
Jewish Canadian journalists
21st-century Canadian historians